Spiribacter aquaticus  is a Gram-negative and moderately halophilic bacterium from the genus of Spiribacter which has been isolated from a solar saltern from Santa Pola in Spain.

References

External links
Type strain of Spiribacter aquaticus at BacDive -  the Bacterial Diversity Metadatabase

Chromatiales
Bacteria described in 2017
Halophiles